Eric Lartigau (born 20 June 1964) is a French director and screenwriter.

Personal life

His wife Marina Foïs gave birth to their son, named Lazare, born  3 December 2004 and their Second son, Georges, born, September 25, 2008.

Filmography

References

External links
 

1964 births
French film directors
French male screenwriters
French screenwriters
Living people